Joseph Stanley Kozlowski (1912–1992), American portrait and watercolor artist, was born in Frankfort, New York. The family later owned a farm in Clinton, New York and Kozlowski attended Clinton High School. He graduated from Syracuse University in 1936 with a BFA degree. In 1938 he was appointed chief artist and photographer with the Poole-Crockett archaeological expedition to study the Mayan ruins in the Yucatán Peninsula undertaken by Syracuse University. He returned to Yucatán in 1940 for a period of 8 months, using his paintings as barter for food and accommodations.

Following the outbreak of the Second World War, Kozlowski joined the Merchant Marine and served as an able-bodied seaman (AB) shipping war material from New Orleans, Louisiana and Corpus Christi, Texas through the Panama Canal to Honolulu, Hawaii and, as he was fond of saying, "boat loads of post holes" on the return trip. Between ships he worked as a civilian photographer with the Army Air Corps at both Hickam Field, as it was called during the war, in Hawaii and at the Rome Air Depot in Rome, New York, currently called Griffiss Air Force Base.

From 1946 to 1949 he was a photography and art instructor at the Veterans Administration Hospital and rehabilitation facility in Bath, New York.

Settling in the East Syracuse, New York area in 1950, he was frequently commissioned by various organizations affiliated with Syracuse University and the State University of New York to paint portraits of notable members of the teaching staff for their institutional collections. He also worked as a technical illustrator for the Prosperity Company and later freelancing in that capacity. He eventually obtained teaching credentials and taught art in the East Syracuse-Minoa Central School District until he retired in the late 1970s.

Commissioned portraits were most often signed "J.S. Kozlowski", generally in bold block letters. Other works, regardless of medium, were rarely signed or dated.

Known paintings
These lists are incomplete. Any additions or information regarding these or other paintings by the artist would be appreciated.

Portraits

Yvonne Holman, (1938) (Private collection)
Lucie Holman, (1938) (Private collection)
Self Portrait, (1940) (Private collection)
Dr. W.M. Smallwood, (1940) Syracuse University, College of Liberal Arts
Portrait of Mary, (1940) (Private collection)
Captain Stillwell - U.S. Merchant Marine (1945) (Private collection)
Dean H. G. Weiscotten, Syracuse University Medical School (1946)
Professor Emeritus Edward C. Reifenstein Sr, (1946) Upstate Medical University, Syracuse, New York.
Dean William L. Bray, SUNY College of Forestry (1953)
Professor W.J. Davidson, Syracuse University, Athletic Department
Doctor Knowlton, Syracuse University, College of Medicine
Joe Kozlowski, Jr. in high school cap and gown, (1963) (Private collection)
Joe Kozlowski, Jr., (1964) (Private collection)
Professor Emeritus Gordon D. Hoople, (1964) Upstate Medical University, Syracuse, New York.
Professor Carlyle Ferdinand Jacobsen, Ph. D. (1967)
T. Aaron Levy, Syracuse Museum of Fine Arts (later to become the Everson Museum of Art), Syracuse, New York
Dan A. Richert Ph. D., (1973), Upstate Medical University, Syracuse, New York.
Dorothy Ward, East Syracuse Schools (later East Syracuse-Minoa Central School District); (private collection)
Lt. Col. Peter Voninski (USAF), (private collection)
Dr. George Heitzman; (private collection)
Dr. Justice Meuller, Syracuse University Medical School
Elizabeth Blackwell, Syracuse University Upstate Medical Center. The Elizabeth Blackwell painting was used as source material for a USPS $.18 postage stamp. However, credit was not extended by the USPS for some time after the issuance of the stamp. After a full investigation determined that Kozlowski's painting was, in fact, the original source for the stamp design the USPS tightened its rules regarding the documentation of source materials in order for design acceptance and acknowledged the role of the painting in the design process.

Landscape and still life
Characters in a Bar-room; Oil on canvas (1936) (Private collection / Australia)
Night Skyline, Chicago; Oil on masonite, (~1938-39) (Private collection)

Tulum; Oil on canvas, (1940) (Private collection)
Temple of the Dwarf, Uxmal; Oil on canvas, (1940) (Private collection)
Cohoctan Valley; Watercolor (~1948) (Private collection)
Farmers Bounty; Oil on canvas (1949) (Private collection)
Erie Canal Aqueduct; Watercolor, (196x) (Private collection)
A series of three watercolors with basically the same composition, decanter and background. They were given as gifts to Kozlowski's son and two of his son's friends in 1981:
Still Life with Red Onions; Watercolor (196x-1970x) (Private collection)
Still life with Oranges; Watercolor (196x-1970x) (Private collection)
Still life with Lemons; Watercolor (196x-1970x) (Private collection)
Wine and Apples; Oil on paperboard (1972) (Private collection)
Red Peppers; Watercolor (1979) (Private collection)

References

External links 
Historical Collections of the Upstate Medical University Health Services Library listing five of Kozlowski's paintings in their possession with color photographs - including the portrait of Elizabeth Blackwell.

1912 births
1992 deaths
20th-century American painters
American male painters
American portrait painters
Syracuse University alumni
Artists from Syracuse, New York
American sailors
People from Frankfort, New York
People from DeWitt, New York
20th-century American male artists